Álvaro Enrigue (born 6 August 1969 in Guadalajara, Mexico) is a Mexican novelist, short-story writer, and essayist. Enrigue is the author of six novels, three books of short stories, and one book of essays.

Early life 
The son of Jorge Enrigue, a Jalisco lawyer and Maria Luisa Soler, a chemist and a refugee from Barcelona, he is the youngest of four brothers (among them also the writer Jordi Soler). Shortly after his birth, the family moved to Mexico City because of his father's work.

He studied for a degree in Journalism at the Universidad Iberoamericana, where he later worked as a literature professor. As a young man, he began his career as an editor and columnist in various cultural magazines, including Vuelta, founded and directed by Octavio Paz, and later Letras Libres. Later, he was editor at the Fondo de Cultura Económica (FCE) and at the Secretariat of Culture (then known as CONACULTA).

Career
In 1996, at the age of 27, Enrigue was awarded the prestigious Joaquín Mortiz Prize for his first novel, La muerte de un instalador (Death of an Installation Artist). Since then it has been reprinted five times, and in 2012 it was selected as one of the key novels of the Mexican 20th century, and anthologized by Mexico's largest publishing house, Fondo de Cultura Económica. His books Vidas perpendiculares (Perpendicular Lives) and Hipotermia (Hypothermia) have also been widely acclaimed.

Both novels have been published by Gallimard. Hypothermia, which offers an "unflinching gaze towards 21st-century life and the immigrant experience", was published in 2013 in the United States and England by Dalkey Archive Press in a translation by Brendan Riley. His 2011 novel, Decencia (Decency), received praise in Latin America's and Spain's most relevant publications.

In 2007, he was selected as one of the most influential contemporary writers in Spanish by the Hay Festival's Bogotá39. In 2009, he was awarded a Rockefeller Foundation Residence Fellowship at the Bellagio Centre to finish the manuscript of his novel, Decencia (Decency). In 2011 he became a fellow at the Cullman Center for Writers and Scholars of the New York Public Library, where he began working on his fifth novel.

On November 4, 2013, Enrigue's novel Muerte súbita (Sudden Death) was announced as the winner of the 31st Herralde Novel Prize, joining a distinguished list of works by authors from Spain and Latin America, including Sergio Pitol, Enrique Vila-Matas, Álvaro Pombo, Javier Marías, Juan Villoro, and Roberto Bolaño.

Along with his work as a writer, he has worked as a professor of creative writing at several universities in the United States, such as Columbia, Princeton, and Maryland; also studying a PhD in Latin American Literature in the latter one.

His work has been translated into multiple languages, including English, German, French, Czech, and Chinese.

Personal life 
Enrigue resides in the Hamilton Heights neighborhood in New York City.

Selected publications
La muerte de un instalador, Mexico City: Joaquín Mortiz (1996); 
Virtudes capitales, Mexico City: Editorial Joaquín Mortiz, 1998, 
El cementerio de sillas, Madrid/Mexico City: Ediciones Lengua de Trapo, 2002, 
Hipotermia, Barcelona/Mexico City: Anagrama (2006); English translation: 
Vidas perpendiculares, Barcelona/Mexico City: Editorial Anagrama, 2008, 
Decencia, Barcelona/Mexico City: Editorial Anagrama, 2011, 

Muerte súbita, Barcelona/Mexico City: Editorial Anagrama, 2013, ; English translation: Sudden Death, Riverhead, 2016, 
Un samurái ve el amanecer en Acapulco, Mexico City: La Caja de Cerillos Ediciones, December 2013, 
Ahora me rindo y eso es todo, Barcelona/Mexico City: Editorial Anagrama, 2018,

References

External links
List of relevant reviews of Álvaro Enrigue's latest novel, Decencia
Álvaro Enrigue by Scott Esposito Bomb
Alvaro Enrigue recorded at the Library of Congress for the Hispanic Division's audio literary archive on September 5, 2015

1969 births
Living people
Writers from Guadalajara, Jalisco
20th-century Mexican novelists
Mexican male novelists
People from Manhattan
21st-century Mexican novelists